Kim Jinai (born 16 February 1953), also known as Kim Jin-ae, is a South Korean urban engineer and politician.

Biography 

In 1971 Kim was the only woman admitted to study at Seoul National University College of Engineering which building then only had men's bathrooms.

Upon return from studying at Massachusetts Institute of Technology, Kim took several notable urban planning projects such as creating Sanbon Newtown, one of satellite cities of Seoul, and restructuring Insa-dong. She took numerous policy advisory roles to the government of both conservative and liberal presidents and major construction projects like Sejong City.

For the 2008 general election, Kim was placed as number 17 of the proportional list for preceding party of now Democratic Party of Korea but failed to be elected. However, after one of the members elected via proportional list resigned, she finally became a lawmaker in November 2009. Highlighting the problems of "Four Major River project" of Lee Myung-bak administration is her best known work as a parliamentarian to the public.

For the 2012 general election, Kim applied to earn Democratic Party's nomination for Seoul Mapo A constituency but lost to Noh Woong-rae.

For the 2020 general election, Kim was placed as the top of the list of newly created party's proportional representation list. Kim assumed the floor leadership as she is the only lawmaker of her party who has served more than once. In December 2020, Kim announced her candidacy for Seoul Mayor in the upcoming by-election in April 2021. On 8 March 2021 Kim submitted her resignation as a member of the National Assembly to focus on her campaign as mayor of the capital of the country. After their agreed poll found Park Young-sun of Democratic Party more fit for office, Kim and her party endorsed Park for the post. Following Kim's resignation, a former spokesperson of President Moon Jae-in, Kim Eui-kyeom will succeed her seat at the parliament on 24 March 2021.

Kim was previously a visiting professor of architecture at Ewha Womans University and an adjunct professor at KAIST.

Kim holds three degrees in architecture - a bachelor's degree from Seoul National University, a master's from Massachusetts Institute of Technology and a doctorate in urban planning from MIT. She graduated from Ewha Girls' High School.

Electoral history

Awards 

  Order of Civil Merit by the government of South Korea (1998)
 Time's Global 100 Roster of Young Leaders for the New Millennium (1994)

References 

Living people
1953 births
People from Siheung
Massachusetts Institute of Technology alumni
Seoul National University alumni
Academic staff of Ewha Womans University
Academic staff of KAIST
Women urban planners
South Korean women engineers
Minjoo Party of Korea politicians
Uri Party politicians
Members of the National Assembly (South Korea)
South Korean women academics
South Korean architects